New Village Press is a not-for-profit book publisher founded in 2005 in the San Francisco Bay Area now based in New York, New York. It began as a national publishing project of Architects/Designers/Planners for Social Responsibility (ADPSR), an educational non-profit organization founded in 1981.

New Village Press books address topics in the fields of social justice, urban ecology, community development and culture such as community arts, neighborhood commons, and participatory democracy.

In 2006, New Village Press was selected as the "Best Small Publisher in the East Bay", by East Bay Express. It partners with and is distributed by New York University Press.

History 
New Village Press originated as New Village Journal, a periodical published from 1999 until 2002, which focused on the revitalization of communities. In 2018, New Village Press incorporated as its own nonprofit, separating from Architects/Designers/Planners for Social Responsibility. New Village Press began a distribution partnership with NYU Press in 2018. Originally based in Oakland, CA, New Village Press is now situated in New York, NY.

Recent titles 

My Life in 100 Objects by Margaret Randall (2020) 
Main Street: How a City's Heart Connects Us All by Mindy Thompson Fullilove (2020) 
A Man of the Theater: Survival as an Artist in Iran by Nasser Rahmaninejad (2020) 
Visitors: An American Feminist in East Central Europe by Ann Snitow (2020) 
Waging Peace in Vietnam: U.S. Soldiers and Veterans Who Opposed the War edited by Ron Carver, David Cortright and Barbara Doherty (2019) 
Such a Pretty Girl: A Story of Struggle, Empowerment, and Disability Pride by Nadina LaSpina (2019) 
In the Company of Rebels: A Generational Memoir of Bohemians, Deep Heads, and History Makers by Chellis Glendinning (2019) 
Placemaking with Children and Youth: Participatory Practices for Planning Sustainable Communities by Victoria Derr, Louise Chawla and Mara Mintzer (2018) 
Works of Heart: Building Village Through the Arts by Lynne Elizabeth and Suzanne Young (2018) 
Conversations with Diego Rivera: The Monster in His Labyrinth by Alfredo Cardona Peña, translated by Alvaro Cardona-Hine (2018) 
Homeboy Came to Orange: A Story of People’s Power by Ernest Thompson and Mindy Thompson Fullilove (2018) 
The Earth, the City, and the Hidden Narrative of Race by Carl Anthony (2017) 
Beginner’s Guide to Community-Based Arts, 2nd Edition by Keith Knight and Mat Schwarzman (2017) 
Root Shock by Mindy Thompson Fullilove, New Village Press edition (2016) 
Openings by Sabra Moore (2016) 
Growing a Life by Illène Pevec (2016)

Notable authors
 Carl Anthony, architect and environmental justice activist
 Linda Frye Burnham, a writer focused on performance and community arts
 William Cleveland, director of the Center for the Study of Art and Community
David Cortright, American scholar and peace activist.
 Sharon Gamson Danks, environmental planner and founder of Bay Tree Design
 Mindy Thompson Fullilove, clinical psychiatrist and educator
 Arlene Goldbard, writer, social activist, and consultant
 Chester Hartman, urban planner, low-income housing advocate, and academic
 Anne Herbert (writer), former assistant editor of CoEvolution Quarterly
 Spoon Jackson, poet and writer who discovered his talent while serving a life sentence
 James Jiler,  executive director of Urban GreenWorks
 Roger Katan, architect and artist
 Keith Knight (cartoonist), syndicated cartoonist
Glenna Lang, illustrator, designer, and artist
 Annie Lanzillotto, poet and performance artist
Nadina LaSpina, disability rights activist. 
 Karl Linn, landscape architect and founder of the community garden movement in the United States
 Sabra Moore, artist and activist
 Beverly Naidus, artist and educator
 Illène Pevec, educator focusing on the development of youth gardens
Margaret Randall, feminist poet and social activist 
 Ronald Shiffman, cofounder of the Pratt Institute Center for Community and Environmental Development
 Judith Tannenbaum, writer and prison arts educator
 Lily Yeh, international artist
 Alfredo Cardona Peña, journalist, poet, essayist, biographer 
 Louise Chawla, environmental activist with a focus on children and nature  
 Ann Snitow, writer, teacher, feminist activist
 Nasser Rahmaninejad, artist, activist, lecturer on theatre and politics

References

External links 
 New Village Press

Small press publishing companies
Publishing companies established in 2005
2005 establishments in California
Book publishing companies based in New York (state)
Companies based in New York City
Non-profit publishers
Social justice organizations